Mirage Records is the name of multiple music business entities, the most notable of which was an American record label founded by Jerry and Bob Greenberg in 1980. The label, also known as Mirage Music or simply Mirage, was distributed first by Atlantic Records and later by Atco Records. Artists who released records on this label included Godley & Creme, Rose Tattoo, Phoebe Snow, and Whitesnake. The first record on this imprint was released in 1980. The label's catalogue is now controlled by Unidisc.

Mirage Records artists
The following is a list of artists who have recorded for Mirage Records.

Brenda K. Starr
Godley & Creme
Kano
Jean Knight
T.S. Monk
Gary Moore
Rage
Rose Tattoo
Shannon
G.E. Smith
Robin Gibb
Mark Shreeve
Phoebe Snow
Southside Johnny & the Jukes
The System
Toni Tennille
Nolan Thomas
Whitesnake
Xavion

References

External links
 

American record labels
Record labels established in 1980